Events from the year 1920 in Taiwan, Empire of Japan.

Incumbents

Central government of Japan
 Prime Minister: Hara Takashi

Taiwan
 Governor-General – Den Kenjirō

Events

January
11 January – Fouding of the New People Society.

Births
 7 March – Bo Yang, Taiwanese writer
 29 March – Hung Tung, Taiwanese painter 
 23 July – , Taiwanese politician, Mayor of Taichung (1973–1977)
 19 September – Lin Tsung-yi, Taiwanese psychiatrist
 27 October – Ts'ao Yung-ho, Taiwanese historian

References

 
Years of the 20th century in Taiwan